Goran Trobok (born 6 September 1974) is a Serbian former footballer who played as a defensive midfielder.

Early life
A Bosnian Serb, Trobok was born in Pale, Bosnia and Herzegovina, but moved to Budva, Montenegro at the age of 17 with the onset of the Bosnian War.

Club career
While playing for Budućnost Podgorica (1993–1997) and Partizan (1997–2003) in the First League of Serbia and Montenegro, Trobok became the most capped player in the competition's history. He also won three national championship titles and two national cups with the Crno-beli.

International career
Between 2000 and 2004, Trobok made 10 official appearances for the national team of Serbia and Montenegro (previously known as FR Yugoslavia). He also represented the nation at the Millennium Super Soccer Cup in India, winning the tournament (not officially recognized by FIFA).

Career statistics

Honours
Partizan
 First League of FR Yugoslavia: 1998–99, 2001–02, 2002–03
 FR Yugoslavia Cup: 1997–98, 2000–01

References

External links
 
 
 

Association football midfielders
Chinese Super League players
Expatriate footballers in China
Expatriate footballers in Russia
FC Shinnik Yaroslavl players
FC Spartak Moscow players
First League of Serbia and Montenegro players
FK Budućnost Podgorica players
FK Partizan players
FK Smederevo players
Montenegrin First League players
OFK Petrovac players
Russian Premier League players
Serbia and Montenegro expatriate footballers
Serbia and Montenegro expatriate sportspeople in China
Serbia and Montenegro expatriate sportspeople in Russia
Serbia and Montenegro footballers
Serbia and Montenegro international footballers
Serbian SuperLiga players
Serbs of Bosnia and Herzegovina
Shanghai Shenhua F.C. players
Footballers from Sarajevo
1974 births
Living people